The 1992–93 Iraq FA Cup was the 16th edition of the Iraq FA Cup as a clubs-only competition. The tournament was won by Al-Zawraa for the eighth time in their history, beating Al-Talaba 2–1 in the final.

Bracket

Matches

Quarter-finals

Semi-finals

Final

References

External links
 Iraqi Football Website

Iraq FA Cup
Cup